The spotfin frogfish, Antennatus nummifer, is a fish of the family Antennariidae, found in all subtropical oceans to depths of 300 m. This species can be found in the aquarium trade.

Information
The species varies in color to match their surroundings. They are known for their ability to camouflage and get lost in their surroundings to avoid predators. They are able to lure in their prey with a stalk found between their eyes that imitates the movements of their prey; its mouth can be opened and expanded to the same width as its body to catch and swallow prey. They feed on small fish, crustaceans, and worms.

Names
The spotfin frogfish is also commonly known as:
Coin-bearing frogfish
Dark-spotted frogfish
Spotfin anglerfish
Spotfin angler
Whitefinger anglerfish
Whitefinger frogfish

Location
The spotfin frogfish can be found on sheltered reefs and on sandy bottoms with rich sponge growth along them. They are widespread across the Indo-Pacific region.

References
 
 Tony Ayling & Geoffrey Cox, Collins Guide to the Sea Fishes of New Zealand,  (William Collins Publishers Ltd, Auckland, New Zealand 1982)

External links
 

Antennariidae
Taxa named by Georges Cuvier
Fish described in 1817